Henry Edward Surtees, (9 May 1819 – 31 July 1895) was a British Conservative Party politician.

Family
Born in Durham in 1819, Surtees was the son of Robert Surtees and Elizabeth Cookson. He first married Elizabeth Snell Chauncy, daughter of Charles Snell Chauncy and Elizabeth Beale, in 1843. Together they had three children:
 Elizabeth Ellen (1844–1914)
 Caroline Isabel (1848–1946)
 Georgina Mary (1849–1876)

After Elizabeth's death in 1854, he remarried to Mary Isabella Adams, daughter of Francis Adams and Maria Doveton, in 1870. Together, they had three children:
 Henry Siward Balliol (1873–1955)
 Cicely Isabel (1872– )
 Robert Lambton (1879– )

Political career
He was elected MP for Hertfordshire at a by-election in 1864 and held the seat until 1868.

Other activities
In 1839, Surtees became a Lieutenant in the 10th Royal Hussars. He was also a Justice of the Peace for Hertfordshire and County Durham, and a Deputy Lieutenant of Durham. In 1876, he was High Sheriff of Durham

References

External links
 

Conservative Party (UK) MPs for English constituencies
Deputy Lieutenants of Durham
High Sheriffs of Durham
UK MPs 1859–1865
UK MPs 1865–1868
1819 births
1895 deaths
People educated at Harrow School
Members of the Parliament of the United Kingdom for Hertfordshire